The Cats & Dogs film series consists of spy-comedies, produced by Warner Bros. Entertainment; including two theatrical movies, and one straight-to-home video release. Centered around a conflict of the ages between the titular species, the plot involves agents of two opposing covert operations agencies of rival animals. The teams of spies work together, unbeknownst to its human inhabitants.

The first film was met with mixed critical reception. Praise was directed at its watchability for an audience of all ages, as well as its concept, creativity and effective use of special effects. Overall it fared well at the box office. Conversely, the second installment was met with mostly negative critical reviews with criticism for its familiarly formulative plot, while receiving praise for its "faster, funnier" nature; while being ultimately deemed financially, a box office flop. The third movie was met with overwhelming negative reviews with criticism was directed towards its story plot, its use of juvenile humor, what was classified as poor CGI special effects, and its unoriginality. Despite this, George Lopez's role in the story was noted as a redeeming contribution to the film. As the film went straight-to-video release, its sales compared to its budget lost money for the studio.

Film

Cats & Dogs (2001) 

A high-tech, secret war takes place throughout neighborhoods worldwide that human beings are not aware of stemming from an ancient rivalry between cats and dogs. When a Persian cat named Mr. Tinkles implements a plan to destroy a breakthrough vaccination that is intended to end all human allergies to man's best friend, a Beagle named Louis "Lou" Brody is recruited by D.O.G., a discreet espionage organization of canines. Under the mentorship of an Anatolian Shepherd, Lou scrambles to foil the nefarious plans of M.E.O.W.S., the counterpart organization of felines.

Cats & Dogs: The Revenge of Kitty Galore (2010) 

Amongst generations of battles between cats and dogs, a Sphynx cat former agent of M.E.O.W.S. named Ivana Clawyu, develops a diabolical plan against canines and her former feline collaborators; with a new alias of Kitty Galore. In defense of themselves and their humans agents of separate spy organizations (D.O.G. and M.E.O.W.S.), team up in an unprecedented union to stop Galore from exacting her revenge on the world.

Cats & Dogs 3: Paws Unite! (2020) 

An American Shorthair cat named Gwen and a Border Collie named Roger, are spies covertly working together to defend the world and the unknowing humans. The partnership of cats and dogs comes from the Great Truce, which stopped the ancient rivalry between them for the last decade. A villainous mastermind cockatoo named Pablo seeks to destroy the long-standing truce, by wirelessly manipulating frequencies that only the felines and canines can hear. Together, agents of F.A.R.T. (Furie Animals Rivalry Termination) work to stop the foul-play before it permanently separates the species.

Primary cast and characters

Additional crew and production details

Reception

Box office and financial performance

Critical and public response

References 

Warner Bros. Pictures franchises
 
Film series introduced in 2001
Spy film series